Wilsden is a village and civil parish in west Bradford, in West Yorkshire, England. Wilsden re-acquired civil parish status in 2004. The 2001 census revealed a population of 3,697, increasing to 4,807 at the 2011 Census.

History
During the Roman era, the area was part of the Ancient British (Celtic) kingdom of Elmet. A connection to the original British tribes of the area may have been included in the name of the village; Wilsden is an Old English name and was originally recorded as Wealhas-den, which has been interpreted as "place of the Welsh". Since all speakers of Brittonic languages were known as "Welsh" in Old English, the name may have implied that Wilsden was a place that Britons retreated to, after Anglo-Saxon settlers arrived in the Aire Valley.

The village is mentioned in the Domesday Book as belonging to Gamalbarn and was part of the manor known as Allerton-cum-Wilsden.

A map of 1818, shows Wilsden Hill, Wilsden and Lingbob as being three separate and distinct hamlets. Industrialisation led to the building of mills in the village, the first of which, Albion Mill, was built in 1810 with a further seven following in the same century. Albion Mill was demolished after it suffered a serious fire in 1990.

The church of St Matthew was built in Wilsden in 1826 and was identical to the Church of St Paul in Shipley. The church was demolished in 1962 and ten years later, a modern St Matthew's church was built in a different location in the village.

In 1886, a railway station was opened on the Queensbury to Keighley line that ran to the west of the village. The 616 and 619 bus services connect the village with Harden, Bingley and Eldwick to the north and with Allerton and Bradford to the south. The main road that runs north–south through the village is an unclassified road but connects at the southern end with the B6144 road towards Cullingworth and Bradford, and at the northern end goes through Harden to connect with the B6429 towards Bingley.

Wilsden has many businesses such as Wilsden Autos, Suite Centre, a Co-op and a post office.

The village occupies the high ground to the west of the Aire Valley and is surrounded by upland pastures, enclosed areas, wooded valleys and gritstone moorland.

The Ling Bob public house was built to the south of the village in 1836 and was originally known as the Brown Cow Inn. It was situated in the hamlet of Ling Bob, which was separate from the village of Wilsden at that time, however, the locals all knew the pub as the Ling Bob, so the name stuck.

Wilsden Village Hall

Wilsden village hall holds many groups such as scouting groups, walking group, a weekly auction, a pre-school and others.

Administratively, it is part of the Bingley Rural ward of the City of Bradford and part of the Shipley constituency.

Notable people
Alfred Fowler, Astronomer was born in the village

See also
Listed buildings in Wilsden

References

Sources

External links 

 Wilsden
 
 Webcam located in Wilsden.

Villages in West Yorkshire
Civil parishes in West Yorkshire
Geography of the City of Bradford